Moyle is a Celtic surname that derives from maol meaning  bald. It has been suggested that the surname arises in at least two ways: first, meaning "shaven one" or "tonsured", as in a religious person or a locality near a religious site; and second, a dweller on or near a bald hill.

Notable people who share the surname include:

Arts and entertainment
Allan Moyle (born 1947), Canadian film director
Franny Moyle (born 1964), British television producer and author
Sarah Moyle (born 1969), English stage and television actor

Politics
Arthur Moyle, Baron Moyle (1894–1974), British trade unionist and politician
Colin Moyle (born 1929), New Zealand politician
Edna Moyle (1942–2013), Caymanian politician
Henry Vivian Moyle (1841–1925), South Australian politician
James Moyle (1858–1946), American politician
Joseph Moyle (17th–18th century), Member of Parliament from the UK constituency of Saltash
Mike Moyle (born 1964), American politician
Roland Moyle (1928–2017), British politician
Sir Thomas Moyle (1488–1560), English politician 
Walter Moyle (1672–1721), English politician and political writer
Walter Moyle (MP) (1627–1701), English politician

Sports
Brett Moyle (born 1980), Australian rules footballer 
Graeme Moyle (born 1954), Australian rules footballer
Herbert Moyle (1922–2000), New Zealand cricketer
Jamie Moyle (born 1989), American mixed martial artist
Kendra Moyle (born 1990), American skater
Wallace Moyle (1867–1920), American college sports coach

Other people
Alice Marshall Moyle (1908-2005), Australian ethnomusicologist
Henry D. Moyle (1889–1963), American Mormon leader
Jennifer Moyle (1921–2016), British biochemist
John Moyle (1591–1661), High Sheriff of Cornwall
 John Moyle, first editor of the magazine Electronics Australia
John Moyle (British Army officer) (died 1738), captain in the Royal Regiment of Ireland
John Rowe Moyle (1808–1889), Mormon pioneer
Jonathan Moyle (died 1990), RAF helicopter pilot and magazine editor
Matthew Paul Moyle (1788–1880), Cornish meteorologist and writer on mining
Michael Moyle (magistrate), Isle of Man High Bailiff
Olin R. Moyle (1887–1966), American Jehovah's Witnesses legal counsel
Peter B. Moyle (born 1942), zoologist and associate director of the Center for Watershed Sciences at the University of California-Davis
Richard M. Moyle (born 1944), New Zealand academic specialising in ethnomusicology of the Pacific and Australia
Walter Moyle (judge) (c. 1405 – 1479), Justice of the Common Pleas, England and Wales

See also
John Moyle (disambiguation) 
Moyle (disambiguation)
Moyles (disambiguation)

References